The 1930 Rutgers Queensmen football team represented Rutgers University in the 1930 college football season. In their fourth season under head coach Harry Rockafeller, the Queensmen compiled a 4–5 record and outscored their opponents 159 to 154.

Schedule

References

Rutgers
Rutgers Scarlet Knights football seasons
Rutgers Queensmen football